George A. Cooper (1894–1947) was a British screenwriter and film director.

Partial filmography
 The Shadow of Evil (1921)
 His Wife's Husband (1922)
 Geraldine's First Year (1922)
 Darkness (1923)
 Three to One Against (1932)
 The Eleventh Commandment (1924)
 Claude Duval (1924)
 Settled Out of Court (1925)
 Somebody's Darling (1925)
 If Youth But Knew (1926)
 The Further Adventures of the Flag Lieutenant (1927)
 His Rest Day (1927) short film made in Phonofilm sound-on-film process
 The Coffee Stall (1927) short film made in Phonofilm, starring Mark Lupino (1894-1930)
 Nan Wild (1927) short film made in Phonofilm, featuring Nan Wild
 Olly Oakley (1927) short film made in Phonofilm, featuring Olly Oakley
 The World, the Flesh, the Devil (1932)
 The Roof (1933)
 I Lived with You (1933)
 The Man Outside (1933)
 The Shadow (1933)
 Puppets of Fate (1933)
 Home, Sweet Home (1933)
 The Black Abbot (1934)
 The Case for the Crown (1934)
 Sexton Blake and the Bearded Doctor (1935)
 Royal Eagle (1936)
 Men Without Honour (1939)
 Down Our Alley (1939)
 Loyal Heart (1946)

References

External links

1894 births
1947 deaths
British male screenwriters
British film directors
20th-century British screenwriters